Priuralovka is a rural locality (a village) in Arkh-Latyshsky Selsoviet, Arkhangelsky District, Bashkortostan, Russia. The population was 55 as of 2010. There are 6 streets.

Geography 
Priuralovka is located 21 km southeast of Arkhangelskoye (the district's administrative centre) by road. Chik-Yelga is the nearest rural locality.

References 

Rural localities in Arkhangelsky District